Allan James Morrison (born 31 March 1982) is a Scottish former professional footballer who played as a goalkeeper.

Career
Morrison played for Celtic, Carlisle United, Clyde, Stranraer and Glenafton Athletic. In May 2004 he was initially told by Clyde that he could not stay at the club as they could not afford to pay his wages.

In November 2012 he was working as a goalkeeping coach at Ayr United.

As a Celtic youth team player, Morrison played in the 2001 Scottish Youth Cup final, which Aberdeen won 2–0 at Hampden Park.

References

1982 births
Living people
Scottish footballers
Celtic F.C. players
Carlisle United F.C. players
Clyde F.C. players
Stranraer F.C. players
Glenafton Athletic F.C. players
Scottish Football League players
Association football goalkeepers
Ayr United F.C. non-playing staff